This is a selected list of works of Fanny Crosby.

Biographies
 [Carleton, Will]. Fanny Crosby's Life-Story. New York, NY: Every Where Publishing Company, 1903.
 [Carleton, Will]. Fanny Crosby's Life-Work. New York, NY: Every Where Publishing Company, 1905.
 Memories of Eighty Years. Boston, MA: James H. Earle & Company, 1906.
 Keller, Cozette; Fanny Crosby, and William Howard Doane. Safe in the Arms of Jesus: Illustrated Pantomimed Hymn. Edgar S. Werner, 1917.
 This is My Story, This Is My Song, 1906. .

Books of poetry
 The Blind Girl. Wiley & Putnam, 1844.
 Monterey and Other Poems. R. Craighead, 1851.
 A Wreath of Columbia’s Flowers. H. Dayton, 1858.
 Bells at Evening and Other Verses; with Biographical Sketch by Robert Lowry. New York, NY: Biglow & Main, 1897; 3rd ed., New York, NY and Chicago, IL: Biglow & Main, 1899.

Cantatas
 -------- and George Frederick Root. The Flower Queen: A Tonic Sol-fa Cantata. Advertiser and Chronicle Offices, 1880.
 -------- and George Frederick Root. Libretto of The Flower Queen; or the Coronation of the Rose. New York: Mason Brothers, 1853.
 -------- and Hart Pease Danks. Conquered by Kindness: A Juvenile Operetta. New York, NY: Wm. A. Pond, 1881.
 -------- and Hart Pease Danks. Zanie: An Operetta. Cincinnati: John Church Co., 1887.
 -------- and Theodore E. Perkins. "The Excursion". In The Mount Zion Collection of Sacred and Secular Music: Consisting of Tunes, Anthems, Singing School Exercises and Songs for the Sabbath School and Social Circle. Edited by Theodore E. Perkins. New York, NY: A.S. Barnes & Co., 1869.
 -------- and William Howard Doane. Santa Claus' Home; or, The Christmas Excursion: A Christmas Cantata for the Sunday School and Choir. Biglow & Main, 1886.
 -------- ; George Frederick Root; Chauncy M. Cady; and William Batchelder Bradbury. DANIEL: or the Captivity and Restoration. A Sacred Cantata in Three Parts, Words selected and prepared by C[hauncy]. M[arvin]. Cady, Esq., [1824-1889], assisted by Miss F[rances]. J[ane]. Crosby. [Mrs. Van Alstyne] [1820-1915]. Music composed by Geo[rge]. F[rederick]. Root [1820-1895] and W[illiam]. B[atchelder]. Bradbury [1816-1868], 
 -------- ; George Frederick Root; and Henry Fisher. The New Flower Queen: or, The Coronation of the Rose. A Cantata in Two Parts, for the Use of Singing Classes in Academies, Ladies' Schools, and High Schools. Oliver Ditson co., 1870.

Popular songs
Fare Thee Well Kitty Dear—1852
Mother, Sweet Mother Why Linger Away--(New York, NY: William Hall & Son, 1852)
Bird of the North--(Feb. 1852)
The Hazel Dell--(1853) 
There's Music in the Air-- (1857)

Selected hymns
 "All the Way My Savior Leads Me"—1875, music by Robert Lowry
 "Blessed Assurance"—1873, music by Phoebe Knapp
 "The Bright Forever"—1871, music by Hubert P. Main
 "Close to Thee"—1874, music by Silas J. Vail
 "Eye Hath Not Seen"—1890, music by George C. Stebbins
 "He Hideth My Soul"—1890, music by William J. Kirkpatrick
"More Like Jesus" 
 "I Am Thine, O Lord (Draw Me Nearer)"—1875, music by W. Howard Doane
 "Jesus Is Tenderly Calling You Home (Jesus is Calling)"—1883, music by George C. Stebbins
 "My Savior First of All"—1891, music by John R. Sweney
 "Near the Cross"—1869, music by W. Howard Doane
 "Pass Me Not, O Gentle Saviour"—1868, music by W. Howard Doane
 "Praise Him! Praise Him! Jesus, Our Blessed Redeemer!"—1869, music by Chester G. Allen
 "Redeemed, How I Love to Proclaim It!"—1882, music by William J. Kirkpatrick
 "Rescue the Perishing, Care for the Dying"—1869, music by W. Howard Doane
 "Safe in the Arms of Jesus"—1868, music by W. Howard Doane
 "Saved by Grace"—1891, music by George C. Stebbins
 "Savior, More Than Life to Me"—1875, music by W. Howard Doane
 "Take the World, But Give Me Jesus"—1879, music by John R. Sweney
 "Tell Me the Story of Jesus"—1880, music by John R. Sweney
 "To God Be the Glory"—1875, music by W. Howard Doane
 "Unsearchable Riches"—1882, music by John R. Sweney

References

Crosby, Fanny